María de los Ángeles de las Heras Ortiz (4 October 1944 – 25 March 2006), better known professionally as Rocío Dúrcal, was a Spanish singer and actress. Widely successful in Mexico, she earned the sobriquet of Reina de las Rancheras ("Queen of Rancheras").

In 2005 Dúrcal received a Latin Grammy Award for musical excellence, a prize that is awarded by the Governing Board of the Recording Latin Academy to artists who have made creative contributions of outstanding artistic significance during their careers.

Career 
Dúrcal began her artistic career by participating in various radio song festivals and competitions, secretly supported by her paternal grandfather, who always believed in her talent and became her first fan. In 1959, with the approval of her parents, she participated in the television program Primer Aplauso, broadcast by Televisión Española. The theme that she chose for the contest was the traditional song "La sombra vendo". Luis Sanz, a Madrid manager who watched the show, was impressed by her talent and personality. Sanz contacted the program for the name and the address of the young contestant.

Acting 
Her first film was Canción de Juventud (1962) directed by Luis Lucia. The plot of the film portrayed a teenager with her own personality. The movie scored huge box office and critics success. This success was repeated in other Spanish-speaking countries where the movie was shown. Immediately Dúrcal became the star of Rocío de La Mancha. Following this, she got her first record deal with transnational Phonogram (now Universal Music). The songs the artist played in both films served to make her first album, Las películas de Rocío Dúrcal (1962).

In Dúrcal's third film, Tengo 17 años (1964), she put aside her role of "child star". That same year, she appeared in her first theater play, Un domingo en Nueva York, in which she was revealed as a great theatrical actress. In 1965 she filmed Más bonita que ninguna; the band Los Brincos wrote some songs for the movie. In 1966, she shared the spotlight with Enrique Guzmán in the film Acompáñame. She began to perform duets with such singers as Jaime Morey and Amalia de Isaura. Then she co-starred in the film Amor en el Aire (1967) with the then young Argentine singer-songwriter Palito Ortega. In 1968 she filmed Cristina Guzmán, the first of her films that was aimed at an audience over 18.

Her last film was with Bárbara Rey in Me Siento Extraña in 1977.

Singing 
In 1970, Dúrcal married Filipino-born musician Antonio Morales (known professionally as Júnior), who would manage her singing career. In 1972, Antonio Morales began a series of television shows in Spain and Latin America singing with his wife as a duet. Their first child, Spanish actress Carmen Morales de las Heras, was born in December 1970. After the birth of their second child, Antonio Morales de las Heras, in April 1974, Morales decided to give up his career to devote time to their children. Dúrcal meanwhile continued her film and singing career. In 1979 she had her third child, Shaila Morales de las Heras, who took up a singing career under the stage name of Shaila Dúrcal and is also a successful singer.

In 1977, Dúrcal signed a contract with Ariola Eurodisc (with singer-songwriter Camilo Sesto supporting her in her projects) dedicating herself to the musical career. That year, while in Mexico, she met the Mexican singer-songwriter Alberto Aguilera Valadez, better known as Juan Gabriel, who decided to record a whole album of rancheras performed by Rocío Dúrcal entitled Rocío Dúrcal canta a Juan Gabriel. Without further advertising, the LP received high levels of sales, so Dúrcal and Juan Gabriel considered the possibility of a new recording together. They ended up doing 5 LPs, marking the revival of Rocío Dúrcal as a singer. The final collaboration between Dúrcal and Juan Gabriel emerged in 10 albums. Dúrcal's album named Canta A Juan Gabriel Volumen 6 (1984) is among the top ten best-selling albums in the history of Mexico. For this album Rocío Dúrcal received her first Grammy Award nomination.

The collaboration of Dúrcal with Juan Gabriel was interrupted by disagreements between the artists and because of problems of Juan Gabriel with his record label, so Dúrcal continued to record albums with other songwriters such as Marco Antonio Solís and Rafael Pérez Botija (with whom under his leadership in 1981 she recorded the album of ballads Confidencias). In 1988 she recorded the album Como Tu Mujer with producer Marco Antonio Solis.

In 1990, she recorded her first album on CD format entitled Si Te Pudiera Mentir. In 1991, Durcal offered a concert at the National Auditorium in Mexico City, recorded in a double disc El Concierto... En Vivo. Between 1992 and 1993 she recorded the album Desaires, produced by the Mexican singer and songwriter Joan Sebastián. In this album she reprises ranchera.

In 1995, she launched her production Hay Amores Y Amores, with songs written and produced by the Argentine Roberto Livi. For this album she was nominated again to the Grammy Awards in the category "Best Latin Pop Album". In 1997 the double album Juntos Otra Vez brought Rocío Dúrcal and Juan Gabriel together again for the last time. That album was made by an engagement with the record company and not by the desire of both artists to continue to cooperate.

In 1998, under the direction of her discoverer Luis Sanz, Dúrcal starred in the Spanish TV show Los negocios de mamá, broadcast by Televisión Española. In 2000, she celebrated 40 years in the industry. In that year she returned to ranchera music with the album Caricias, under the production of songwriter and producer Bebu Silvetti. In 2001 Rocío Dúrcal recorded Entre Tangos Y Mariachi, again produced by Bebu Silvetti, an album that includes 10 of the most famous Argentine tango arrangements interpreted with ranchero/bolero style like her previous album. In the summer of 2001 Dúrcal made a successful tour in Spain, 13 years after her last Spanish performance.

After a year and a half absence, she returned to the stage on 19 September 2002 with a concert at the National Auditorium in Mexico, which was recorded in a double album that was released on CD and then on DVD on 22 October 2002, En Concierto... Inolvidable. The album was nominated for a Latin Grammy Award.
In 2003, the artist received another Latin Grammy Award nomination for her album Caramelito, produced by Kike Santander. In May 2004 she returned to Spain to record what would be her last album, Alma Ranchera, which was nominated for a Latin Grammy Award, but did not win.

Illness and death 

In 2001, after recording her album Entre Tangos y Mariachi, Dúrcal was diagnosed with uterine cancer. Dúrcal canceled her tours while undergoing medical treatment, and resumed touring in 2002. In 2003, from Spain, she collaborated with the Mexican singer Julio Preciado for a duet in the song "Si nos dejan" included in his album Que me siga la tambora.

Rocío Dúrcal died on 25 March 2006 at the age of 61 from uterine cancer at her home in Torrelodones, Madrid. She was cremated and a portion of her ashes were scattered in Spain while the remainder of her ashes were deposited into a crypt at Basilica of Our Lady of Guadalupe in Mexico City, the same place where years later a portion of the ashes from her husband Antonio Morales who died in 2014, were also deposited next to her.

Selected discography

Albums 

 Philips-Phonogram
 1962: Canción de Juventud
 1963: Rocío de la Mancha
 1963: Las Películas de Rocío Dúrcal
 1964: La Chica del Trébol / La Cenicienta Del Barrio
 1964: Rocío, Canta Flamenco (EP)
 1964: Tengo 17 Años
 1964: Villancicos de Rocío (EP)
 1964: Villancicos con Rocío Dúrcal (EP)
 1965: Más Bonita Que Ninguna
 1966: Acompáñame
 1967: Buenos Días, Condesita
 1967: Amor En El Aire
 1968: Cristina Guzmán
 1970: Las Leandras
 1972: La Novicia Rebelde / La Novicia Soñadora
 Ariola Eurodisc
 1977: Una Vez Más (Pronto)
 1977: Canta a Juan Gabriel Volumen I (Pronto)
 1978: Canta a Juan Gabriel Volumen II (Pronto)
 1979: Súper Éxitos De Juan Gabriel (Canta a Juan Gabriel Volumen III) (Pronto)
 1980: Canta con Mariachi Volumen IV (Producida por Juan Gabriel) (Pronto)
 1981: Canta a Juan Gabriel Volumen V (Cuando Decidas Volver) (Pronto)
 1981: Confidencias / La Gata (Pronto)
 1982: Canta Lo Romántico De Juan Gabriel (Boleros)  (Pronto)
 1983: Entre Tú y Yo (Ariola)
 1984: Canta A Juan Gabriel Volumen 6 (Jardin De Rosas)  (Ariola)
 1986: Siempre (Ariola)
 1987: Canta 11 Grandes Éxitos De Juan Gabriel (Ariola)
 1988: Como Tu Mujer (Ariola)
 1990: Si Te Pudiera Mentir (Ariola)
 1992: El Concierto... En Vivo (Ariola)
 1992: Mis mejores canciones
 1993: Desaires (Ariola/BMG)
 1995: Hay Amores Y Amores (Ariola/BMG)
 BMG
 1997: Juntos Otra Vez (con Juan Gabriel)
 1999: Para Toda La Vida
 2000: Caricias
 2001: Entre Tangos Y Mariachi
 2002: En Concierto... Inolvidable
 2002: Todo Éxitos
 2003: Caramelito
 2004: Alma Ranchera
 2004: Su Historia y Exitos Musicales Volumen 1
 2004: Su Historia y Exitos Musicales Volumen 2
 2004: Su Historia y Exitos Musicales Volumen 3
 2005: Lo Esencial
 Sony BMG
 2005: Me Gustas Mucho
 2006: Amor Eterno
 2007: Rocío Dúrcal Canta a México
 2009: El Concierto ... En Vivo
 2009: Duetos
 2010: Mis favoritas
 2012: Como dos gotas de agua
 2012: Canciones de amor
 2012: Eternamente

Singles

Filmography

Television

Theatre

References

External links 

 
 Rocío Dúrcal on YouTube
 Rocío Dúrcal on Grammy Awards

1944 births
2006 deaths
20th-century Spanish singers
20th-century Spanish women singers
Actresses from Madrid
Deaths from uterine cancer
Deaths from cancer in Spain
Latin Grammy Lifetime Achievement Award winners
Ranchera singers
Singers from Madrid
Spanish film actresses
Sony Music Latin artists
Spanish expatriates in Mexico
20th-century Spanish actresses
Women in Latin music